The 2018 Hampton Pirates football team represents Hampton University in the 2018 NCAA Division I FCS football season. They are led by first-year head coach Robert Prunty and play their home games at Armstrong Stadium. They will compete as a FCS independent.

On November 16, 2017, the school announced they would become a full member of the Big South Conference in 2018. Due to scheduling reasons, they were to remain in the Mid-Eastern Athletic Conference (MEAC) for football in 2018. However, the MEAC refused to allow Hampton to remain in the conference, with no MEAC schools agreeing to play them, forcing the Pirates to become an FCS independent for 2018 before joining the Big South in 2019.

Previous season
In their final season as a member of the MEAC, the Pirates finished the season 6–5, 5–3 in MEAC play to finish in a tie for fourth place.

On November 20, 2017, head coach Connell Maynor resigned to become the head coach at Alabama A&M. He finished at Hampton with a four-year record of 20–25.

Schedule

Source: Schedule

Game summaries

Shaw

at Monmouth

at Northern Iowa

Charleston Southern

Lane

at Presbyterian

Virginia–Lynchburg

at SUNY Maritime

at Mississippi Valley State

St. Andrews

References

Hampton
Hampton Pirates football seasons
Hampton Pirates football